James Joseph Byrne (July 28, 1908 – August 2, 1996) was an American prelate of the Catholic Church. He was Archbishop of Dubuque from 1962 to 1983, having previously served as Auxiliary Bishop of St. Paul (1947–1956) and Bishop of Boise (1956–1962).

Biography

Early life 
James Byrne was born on July 28, 1908, in St. Paul, Minnesota, to Philip Joseph and Mary Agnes (née McMonigal) Вyrne. One of nine children, he had five brothers and three sisters; one of his brothers, Thomas R. Byrne, served as Mayor of St. Paul from 1966 to 1970. Another brother, Robert Byrne, was an instructor of Latin at Saint Thomas Military Academy.  After graduating from parochial school, he attended Cretin High School in St. Paul.

Byrne enrolled at Nazareth Hall Preparatory Seminary in 1924. In 1927, he continued his studies for the priesthood at St. Paul Seminary. He earned a Bachelor of Sacred Theology degree from the Catholic University of America in Washington, D.C. in 1933.

Priesthood 
On June 3, 1933, Byrne was ordained a priest by Archbishop John Murray at St. Paul Cathedral. His first assignment was as a curate at St. Peter's Church in Mendota. He continued his studies at the Catholic University of Leuven in Belgium, where he earned a Doctor of Sacred Theology degree in 1937 with a thesis entitled: "Idea of Development of Doctrine in Anglican Writings of John Henry Newman."

Following his return to Minnesota, Byrne served as professor of philosophy and theology (1937–45) and academic dean (1941–45) at the College of St. Thomas. He was also a part-time professor of theology at the College of St. Catherine (1940–47) and a professor of theology at St. Paul Seminary (1945–47). In addition to his academic duties, he served as a chaplain at local religious institutions.

Auxiliary Bishop of Saint Paul 

On May 10, 1947, Byrne was appointed auxiliary bishop of the Archdiocese of St. Paul and titular bishop of Etenna by Pope Pius XII. He received his episcopal consecration on the following July 2 from Archbishop Amleto Cicognani, with Bishops Thomas Welch and Francis Schenk serving as co-consecrators, at St. Paul Cathedral. He selected as his episcopal motto: Ad Jesum Per Mariam (Latin: "To Jesus through Mary").As an auxiliary bishop, Byrne served as pastor of the Church of the Nativity Parish in St. Paul (1948–56).

Bishop of Boise
Following the death of Bishop Edward Kelly, Byrne was appointed the fourth Bishop of Boise, Idaho, on June 16, 1956. His installation took place at Cathedral of St. John the Evangelist on August 29 of that year. He remained in Boise for nearly six years.

Archbishop of Dubuque

Following the appointment of Archbishop Leo Binz to the Archdiocese of Saint Paul, Pope John XXIII named Byrne the ninth bishop and seventh archbishop of Dubuque on March 7, 1962.  He was installed as archbishop by the Apostolic Delegate on May 8, 1962, in St. Raphael's Cathedral.  Byrne would serve as the leader of the Dubuque Archdiocese for 21 years.

From 1962-1965, Byrne was present at all four sessions of the Second Vatican Council.  Following the council he was responsible for implementing the reforms promulgated by the council within the archdiocese.  During his time in office, Byrne maintained a relatively low profile in the community.  He was noted for asking that Catholics join him in a televised recitation of the rosary before the evening news, and had cards produced that people could place on top of their television sets.  Archbishop Byrne also encouraged the growing cooperation among the Catholic and Protestant seminaries and colleges in Dubuque and often accepted invitations to participate in seminars and to speak to classes. On one occasion, in an airport, he encountered a Protestant seminarian he had come to know through these activities who was going to interview for a parish position and offered his blessing for his success and for his future ministry. He also devoted as much time as he could to visiting those who were hospitalized in Dubuque.

In 1966 the archdiocese was one of the nation's first dioceses to establish a Priests' Senate. The following year the Archdiocesan Board of Education was established, and adult education was started at the parish level. The Priest Personnel Board was established in 1968 to advise the archbishop on priest assignments in the archdiocese. In 1970 an Interim Pastoral Council was developed as an advisory and consultative group. Villa Raphael was opened in 1971 as a home for retired priests. On October 4, 1979, Pope John Paul II made his historic visit to Iowa with Byrne serving as his official host in his role as "Primate of Iowa." Byrne was also Chancellor of Loras College.

Retirement and legacy 
Pope John Paul II accepted Byrne's resignation on August 23, 1983, and he was named Archbishop Emeritus of Dubuque.  Following his retirement, Byrne remained in the Dubuque area.  He died while a resident at the Stonehill Care Center (operated by Franciscan Sisters) in Dubuque on August 2, 1996, and was buried in the mortuary chapel of St. Raphael's Cathedral along with other deceased bishops and archbishops of the archdiocese.  Byrne had earlier purchased a simple wooden casket from the monks of New Melleray Abbey and stored it at the Cathedral; this was the casket in which he was buried.

References

External links
Diocese of Boise – Previous Bishops

1908 births
1996 deaths
20th-century Roman Catholic archbishops in the United States
Roman Catholic Archdiocese of Saint Paul and Minneapolis
University of St. Thomas (Minnesota) alumni
Catholic University of America alumni
Roman Catholic bishops of Boise
Roman Catholic archbishops of Dubuque
Participants in the Second Vatican Council
Clergy from Saint Paul, Minnesota
Religious leaders from Minnesota